Chris Walby (born October 23, 1956) is a retired Canadian Football League player who played the offensive tackle position almost exclusively with the Winnipeg Blue Bombers. He won three Grey Cups with the Bombers in 1984, 1988, and 1990. Walby was also a sportscaster with the Canadian Broadcasting Corporation's CFL on CBC telecasts following his retirement.

Early life and college career 
Born in Winnipeg, Manitoba, Walby grew up in the city's North End on Polson Avenue. He attended school at St. John's High School where he started playing junior football for the first time in grade 12. Growing up in Winnipeg, the primary sport was hockey and Walby played for the West Kildonan/Kildonan North Stars.

He played in the 1975–76 and 76-77 seasons, scoring four goals and nine assists but racking up 275 penalty minutes. Playing hockey in an era of fighting, he got into a pre-game altercation with teammate Kenny Sutherland. They were both arrested. Walby was charged with assault causing bodily harm and given a two-year conditional sentence. After his junior hockey career, he started playing football with the Winnipeg Rods, and earned an athletic scholarship to play college football at Dickinson State University in North Dakota.

Professional football career 
Following his collegiate career, Walby was drafted in the first round of the 1981 CFL Draft by the Montreal Alouettes.  Walby played five games on the offensive line for them during the 1981 CFL season. Wrangling by management over his salary left Walby without a contract and short pay after he was waived by Montreal general manager Bob Geary; this left him with a bad taste in his mouth, but also with a contract offer from his hometown Winnipeg Blue Bombers. Bombers' assistant general manager Paul Robson greeted Walby at the airport, and within 30 minutes of his arrival had signed him to the Blue and Gold.

Assistant coach Ellis Rainsberger moved Walby from defensive end to right guard in 1982 and 1983. The following season he moved to right tackle, where his success took him to a Hall of Fame career on the offensive line. Robson would say of his playing style that "He was an offensive lineman with a defensive lineman's personality, and that was the best of both worlds."

For the remaining 16 years of his professional football career (1981–1996), Walby was a fixture on the Bombers' offensive line and a favourite of the fans. He was named a CFL All-Star nine times, received the CFL's Most Outstanding Offensive Lineman Award twice, and won the Grey Cup on three occasions. He is often referred to as one of the greatest offensive linemen in the history of the CFL.

Post football career 
After his football career, Walby ran for a seat in the Manitoba Legislature for the Liberal Party of Manitoba but lost. He also was involved in various business ventures such as a restaurant called Hog City Bar and Grill.

Walby was a sportscaster on the CBC's CFL on CBC television broadcasts.

Awards and honours 
In 2003, Walby was elected into the Canadian Football Hall of Fame and in 2005, was chosen as one of the Blue Bombers All-Time 20 Greatest players.  In November 2006, Walby was chosen 22nd amongst the CFL's 50 Greatest Players in a TSN poll.
Inducted into the Manitoba Sports Hall of Fame and Museum in 2006.

References

External links 
 Chris Walby’s biography at Manitoba Sports Hall of Fame and Museum

1956 births
Living people
Canadian Football Hall of Fame inductees
Canadian Football League announcers
Canadian football offensive linemen
Canadian television sportscasters
Dickinson State Blue Hawks football players
Kildonan North Stars players
Montreal Alouettes players
Players of Canadian football from Manitoba
Canadian football people from Winnipeg
Winnipeg Blue Bombers players